Bembecia albanensis is a moth of the family Sesiidae. It is found from most of Europe (except Ireland, Fennoscandia, the Benelux, Portugal, Poland, Ukraine and the Baltic region) to Asia Minor and the Black Sea. It is also found in North Africa.

The larvae feed on Ononis species (including Ononis spinosa, Ononis arvensis, Ononis hircina and Ononis repens) and Psoralea bituminosa. The larvae of ssp. tunetana have been recorded feeding on Hedysarum coronarium.

Subspecies
Bembecia albanensis albanensis (Europe, Asia Minor)
Bembecia albanensis kalavrytana (Sheljuzhko, 1924) (Italy, Greece)
Bembecia albanensis garganica Bertaccini & Fiumi, 2002 (Italy)
Bembecia albanensis tunetana (Le Cerf, 1920) (Tunisia, Sicily, Corsica, Sardinia, Italy)

References

Moths described in 1918
Sesiidae
Moths of Europe
Moths of Asia
Moths of Africa